Pyrgomantis nasuta is a species of praying mantis found in Angola, Cape Province, Cameroon, Kenya, Natal, Namibia, Somalia, and Tanzania.

See also
List of mantis genera and species

References

Pyrgomantis
Mantodea of Africa
Insects described in 1784